The decision analysis (DA) cycle is the top-level procedure for carrying out a decision analysis. Decision analysis (DA) is the discipline comprising the philosophy, methodology, and professional practice necessary to address important decisions in a formal manner.

The traditional decision analysis cycle consists of four phases:
basis development
deterministic sensitivity analysis
probabilistic analysis
basis appraisal.

The diagram below depicts the decision analysis cycle:

A revised form of the cycle consists of an attention-focusing method followed by a decision method, each of which is composed of three stages:
formulation
evaluation
appraisal.

See also
 Decision model
 Decision theory
 Enterprise decision management

References

External links
 Mohammed A. Mian text retrieved 17/09/2011

Decision analysis